Lecythis brancoensis is a species of woody plant in the family Lecythidaceae. It is found in Brazil and Guyana.

References

brancoensis
Flora of Brazil
Flora of Guyana
Vulnerable plants
Taxonomy articles created by Polbot